Downhill racing may refer to:

 Summer sports

 BMX racing
 Downhill inline skating
 Downhill mountain biking
 Longboarding
 Sandboarding
 Slalom skateboarding
 Soapbox racing
 Street luge

 Winter sports

 Alpine skiing
 Ice cross downhill
 Speed skiing
 Ski cross
 Sledding
 Snowboard cross
 Speed skiing